Ross Dickinson (1903-1978) was an American painter. His work is in the permanent collection of the Smithsonian American Art Museum.

Further reading

References

1903 births
1978 deaths
American male painters
Painters from California
20th-century American painters
20th-century American male artists